Drambuie  is a golden-coloured, 40% ABV liqueur made from Scotch whisky, heather honey, herbs and spices. The brand was owned by the MacKinnon family for 100 years, and was bought by William Grant & Sons in 2014.

Etymology 
The name "Drambuie" possibly derives from the Scottish Gaelic phrase an dram buidheach, "the drink that satisfies", a claim made by the original manufacturers of the drink.

History

Legend
After the Battle of Culloden in 1746, Prince Charles Edward Stuart fled to the isle of Skye. There he was given sanctuary by Captain John MacKinnon of Clan MacKinnon. According to family legend, after staying with the captain, the prince rewarded him with this prized drink recipe. This version of events is disputed by historians who believe it to be a story concocted to boost sales of the drink.

The legend holds that the recipe, which at that time had no known name, was given by Clan MacKinnon to John Ross in the late 19th century. James Ross, his son and a local business man, ran the Broadford Hotel in Broadford on Skye. It was he who, after the death of John in 1879, began to experiment with the recipe at the hotel.

Private production
Drambuie is a sweet, golden coloured 40% ABV liqueur made from Scotch whisky, heather honey, herbs and spices.

In the 1880s, Ross developed and improved the recipe, changing the original brandy base to one of scotch whisky, initially for his friends and then later for hotel patrons. Ross named the concoction 'Drambuie' and sold it further afield, eventually reaching markets in France and the United States. As the drink became better known, Ross registered the name as a trademark in 1893.

When Ross died, his widow Eleanor was obliged to sell the recipe to pay for their children's education, by coincidence to another MacKinnon family. Malcolm MacKinnon (known as Calum) worked with Eleanor Ross to continue to make the elixir and experimented with the recipe mix. By 1912, Macbeth & Son, Calum MacKinnon's employers bought the elixir recipe from the Ross family but the company soon ran into financial problems. in 1914, MacKinnon's fiancee, Gina Russell Davidson, encouraged him to buy the failing business and to create the Drambuie Liquor Company. The couple married in 1915 and Gina MacKinnon became the lone custodian of the Drambuie elixir recipe, and took on the responsibility for collecting the ingredients and mixing the elixir in her kitchen. The company expanded and following Callum MacKinnon's death in 1945, Gina MacKinnon became Chair of the company and grew the business, particualrly with exports to the United States.

The latter MacKinnon family produced the drink until 2014, when the company was sold.

Modern production 

Drambuie was first commercially produced in Union Street in Edinburgh in 1910. Only twelve cases were originally sold. In 1916, Drambuie became the first liqueur to be allowed in the cellars of the House of Lords and Drambuie began to ship worldwide to British Army officers' messes.

About 1940, the company moved to bonded premises in Dublin Street Lane where the liquor was compounded (the process of flavouring and sweetening the whisky spirit). The bottling plant was in the same lane while the company office was in York Place. After a short period at nearby Broughton Market, in 1955 the operation was moved to premises at the foot of Easter Road in Leith. Further expansion led to a move to purpose-built premises on the western edge of Kirkliston in 1959. These premises were vacated in 2001 and thereafter production was contracted out, in the first instance to the Glenmorangie bottling plant at Broxburn and, in 2010, to Morrison Bowmore Distillers.

Since 2007, work has been done to strengthen the reputation of the brand after a downturn in popularity and sales.

In 2009, Drambuie launched The Royal Legacy of 1745, an upscale malt whisky liqueur. The 40% alcohol by volume spirit won the Drinks International Travel Retail Award for Best Travel Retail Drinks Launch at the TFWA, Cannes, France in October 2009.

To celebrate the centenary of Drambuie's being bottled in Edinburgh, the makers launched a new style of bottle and embarked on a television and print advertising campaign in 2010. The new bottle, which is clear, allows the colour of the liqueur to be seen. It has a new interlocking "DD" Drambuie icon behind the brand name which also appears on the neck.

In September 2014, Drambuie was sold to the makers of Glenfiddich, William Grant & Sons, for an estimated price of about £100 million.

It was produced under contract at the Morrison Bowmore Distillers facility at Springburn Bond, Glasgow, from 2010 until 2019 when production was transitioned to the William Grant and Sons bottling facility.

Reviews
Recent awards for Drambuie include

 2021 Gold medal 95 points at the IWSC
 2020 Double gold at the ISC
 2019 Gold medal at the ISC

Drambuie received the highest possible score, a "96–100", in the Wine Enthusiasts 2008 spirit ratings competition.

Use in beverages
Drambuie is a key ingredient in several cocktails:
 The Rusty Nail, and its variations, including the Donald Sutherland and the Bent Nail
 Royal Rob Roy
 Whisky Zipper
 Knucklebuster
 Widowmaker
 Old Nick
 Dundee

See also
Glayva
List of liqueurs

References

External links
 

Scottish liqueurs
Herbal liqueurs
Honey liqueurs and spirits
Products introduced in 1893
Scottish brands
West Lothian
Clan Mackinnon
Bacardi
Scottish distilled drinks